Terence James Elkins (born 8 March 1936) is an Australian-born American physicist. In 1960, he participated in an expedition from Mawson Station which conducted the first geological surveys of the Napier Mountains in Antarctica. The highest of this group of mountains, Mount Elkins, was subsequently named after him. In 1979, he received the Harold Brown Award, the Air Force's highest honour for research and development, for research he conducted that contributed to the development of the AN/FPS-118 over-the-horizon backscatter (OTH-B) air defence radar system. This system, consisting of six one-megawatt transmitters and their associated horizontal linear phased array antennas, is currently the largest radar system in the world.

Education
Elkins earned his Bachelor of Electrical Engineering degree from University of Melbourne in 1957. He earned his master's degree in Physics and Astronomy from Boston University in 1967. He earned his PhD from the same institution in 1970, publishing a thesis entitled Studies of Ionospheric Irregularity Using Radio Astronomical Techniques.

Mawson Station (1960–1961)
After completion of his bachelor's degree, Elkins joined the ANARE team that wintered over at Mawson Station in Australian Antarctic Territory, East Antarctica in 1960. The wintering party comprised 33 expeditioners including 12 members of the RAAF Antarctic Flight; the Officer-in-Charge was Hendrick Geysen. That year, Elkins was part of a mechanised and sledging field party that travelled from Mawson Station to the Napier Mountains in Enderby Land, East Antarctica. The men of this expedition, led by fellow Antarctic explorer Syd Kirkby, conducted the first geological surveys of that area of the continent. The highest of this small group of mountains, Mount Elkins, was subsequently named after Dr. Elkins.
Other survey teams that year visited the Framnes Mountains, conducted geological and survey work in the Prince Charles Mountains, and visited the Emperor penguin colonies at Taylor Glacier and Fold Island.

ANARE has since been renamed the Australian Antarctic Program, managed by the Australian Antarctic Division, itself a division of the Department of the Environment, Water, Heritage and the Arts.

Emigration to the United States and early career

Elkins emigrated from his native Australia to the United States in 1963, at the height of the Space Race, after being recruited by the scientific research program of the United States Air Force. Beginning in the early 1960s, he conducted research focused mainly on the upper atmosphere and ionosphere, and improvements to ground, airborne, and space-based surveillance and reconnaissance systems, including over-the-horizon radar systems.

In addition to his work at Hanscom Air Force Base, much of his early research was also conducted at Sagamore Hill Radio Observatory, a ground-based solar observatory located in Hamilton, Massachusetts. Sagamore Hill Solar Radio Observatory is a functional component of the Radio Solar Telescope Network (RSTN).

In 1980, he developed and published an auroral echo-scattering model to predict the obscuration of targets when the radar transmission path is through the auroral region.

Development of the over-the-horizon air defence radar system
Elkins was part of a team of Rome Air Development Center (RADC) engineers that developed and constructed components for frequency modulation/continuous wave (FM/CW) radars capable of detecting and tracking objects at over-the-horizon ranges. A prototype radar was installed and evaluated on 15 September 1970. The system incorporated a Beverage array receive antenna (located at Columbia Air Force Station), a high-power transmitter array (located at Moscow Air Force Station), and an operations center (located at Bangor Airport). This prototype became operational on 30 October of that year. Experimental transmissions from the Maine site covered a 60° sector from 16.5° to 76.5° azimuth and from 900 to 3,300 km in range from the radar.

Based on the success of these early experiments, the Department of Defense proposed to deploy a fully operational radar system. This radar system, covering 180° in azimuth, was built at the same locations in Maine. Initial testing was conducted from June 1980 to June 1981. GE Aerospace (now Lockheed Martin Ocean, Radar and Sensor Systems) received a contract in mid-1982 for full-scale development of the AN/FPS-118 program.

The operational system consisted of multiple OTH-B radars functioning as an early warning system, to detect incoming enemy bombers and cruise missiles. The system, as initially envisioned, was to consist of four sectors:
 East Coast Sector (ECRS): facing east, including a group of three transmitters at Moscow Air Force Station, Maine, a group of three receivers at Columbia Air Force Station, also in Maine, and an operations center located at Bangor International Airport.
 West Coast Sector (WCRS): facing west, including a group of three transmitters at Christmas Valley, Oregon, a group of three receivers at Tule Lake, near Alturas, California, and an operations center at Mountain Home Air Force Base, Idaho.
 North Sector (in Alaska): facing north, cancelled prior to completion
 Central Sector (in Texas): facing south

Only months after the system became fully operational, the Cold War came to an end. The military requirement for the OTH-B radar network was therefore greatly diminished. The mission of the ECRS radar system was redirected to counter-narcotics surveillance and drug interdiction, and the ECRS operated in this capacity for several years. The three OTH radars of the WCRS were mothballed, and the incomplete North Sector in Alaska was cancelled.

The Air Force currently maintains the six East Coast and West Coast OTH-B radars in a state called warm storage, which preserves the physical and electrical integrity of the system and permits recall, should a need arise. It would require at least 24 months to bring these first generation OTH-B radars into an operational status.

Later career
Dr. Elkins spent much of his career at Hanscom Air Force Base in Bedford, Massachusetts, where he conducted research at several of the tenant commands, including the Air Force Cambridge Research Laboratories (AFCRL) and the Geophysics Laboratory. He also conducted research at the Rome Air Development Center, located at Griffiss Air Force Base in Rome, New York. The Geophysics Laboratory is now known as the Phillips Laboratory, while the Rome Air Development Center is now known as the Rome Laboratory. Both research laboratories operate under the Air Force Materiel Command (AFMC).

Over the course of a career that spanned nearly five decades, Dr. Elkins' research focused on development and deployment of electronic systems for the gathering and dissemination of military intelligence, including command, control and communications, satellite imagery, electronic warfare, and systems for remote sensing of the environment from surface, airborne, space and undersea based platforms.

After more than 20 years in research and development for the United States Air Force, he joined the Mitre Corporation in McLean, Virginia, where he continued his research for another 25 years. The majority of his work at MITRE was for the Command, Control, Communications, and Intelligence (C3I) Federally Funded Research and Development Center (FFRDC) supporting the United States Department of Defense.

Awards and recognition
Elkins was the recipient of the 1979 Harold Brown Award. The Harold Brown Award is the Air Force's highest honour for research and development.

Publications
Elkins has published many scientific journal articles, including:

 Ionospheric effects associated with nuclear weapon tests, July–December 1962: a scientific report, by Terence J. Elkins & Alv Egeland (Kiruna Geophysical Observatory, 63:2, 1 March 1963).
 Influence of solar protons on high-latitude ionospheric disturbance, by Terence J. Elkins (Radio Sci., 1: 1195–1200, OCT 1966).
 Frequency dependence of radio star scintillations, by J. Aarons, R.S. Allen, and T.J. Elkins (Journal of Geophysical Research, Volume 72, Issue 11, Pages 2891–2902, 1 June 1967).
 Measurement and interpretation of power spectrums of ionospheric scintillation at a sub-auroral location, by Terence J. Elkins and Michael D. Papagiannis (Journal of Geophysical Research, Volume 74, Pages 4105–4115, 1 August 1969).
 Observations of travelling ionospheric disturbances using stationary satellites, by T.J. Elkins and F.F. Slack (Journal of Atmospheric and Terrestrial Physics, Volume 31, Issue 3, Pages 421–439, MAR 1969).
 Dispersive motions of ionospheric irregularities, by Michael D. Papagiannis and Terence J. Elkins (Journal of Atmospheric and Terrestrial Physics, Volume 32, Issue 3, Pages 383–395, MAR 1970).

References

Further reading

External links
 Australian Antarctic Names and Medals Committee (AANMC)
 Scientific Committee on Antarctic Research (SCAR)
 PDF Map of the Australian Antarctic Territory
 Stations of the Australian Antarctic Division: Mawson Station
 Major Peaks of the Enderby Land Coast Range
 MITRE Corporation Fact Sheet

1936 births
Living people
21st-century American physicists
Australian physicists
Explorers of Antarctica
People from Melbourne
University of Melbourne alumni
Boston University alumni
Australian American
Australian Antarctic scientists